Sri Chandrasekarendra Saraswathi Viswa Maha Vidyalaya [ SCSVMV ] is deemed university at Kancheepuram in Tamil Nadu, India. The university was established in 1993 with the blessing of Their Holiness Pujyasri Jayendra Saraswathi Swamigal and Pujyasri Sankara Vijayendra Saraswati Swamigal. It attained the status of Deemed University in 1993.

The Ministry of Human Resources Development declared the institution a 'Deemed University' under Section 3 of the UGC Act, on 26.05.1993.

Location

Emblem
The motto "Vande Sadgurum Chandrasekharam" means "I adore the virtuous preceptor guru Sri Chandrashekarendra Saraswati Mahaswami", by whose name the Viswa Mahavidyalaya is established. The palm symbolizes the knowledge he transformed to generations. The joining of the thumb and forefinger denotes the merger of brahma and jeeva (the advaita philosophy), which can also be interpreted as integration of the ancient vedic knowledge with modern scientific knowledge. The vyasapeetha (wooden pedestal for books) and the grantha (palm leaves) represent ghatikasthanam (place of knowledge), the 18 vidyasthanams and 64 traditional arts.

Memoranda of understanding
The university has MOUs with the following institutions:
 Birla Institute of Technology and Science
 French Institute of Pondicherry
 Great Lakes Institute of Management
 Indira Gandhi Centre for Atomic Research
 Indian Institute of Technology Madras, Chennai
 Kellogg Graduate School of Management
 National Stock Exchange of India Ltd, Mumbai
 Universitas Hindu Indonesia, Bali, Indonesia
 Yogi Ramsurtkumar Research Foundation for Asian Culture, Tiruvannamalai

Research
The university promotes research and development in all its departments, under the dean of research and development.

Ph.D. programmes are offered in all departments. The Department of Sanskrit and Indian Culture has produced more than 25 doctoral degrees. A large number of researchers are pursuing their doctoral research programmes. Admissions are offered twice a year into the doctoral programmes.

Academic departments
The university consists of the following schools:
School of Management
School of Education
School of Engineering and Technology
School of Science
School of Social Science and Humanity
School of Health and Life Science
School of Languages
School of Sanskrit and Indian Culture

Facilities

Transport
The institution has buses for students and staff members commuting from Kancheepuram, Chennai, Walajabad and Ranipet.

Accommodation
Men's and women's hostels provide on-campus accommodation for students and a mess which provides food for day-scholars and hostelers.

Library
The university has the Sri Chandrasekharendra Saraswathi International Library, established in 1995, housed in Sri Jayendra Saraswathi Diamond Jubilee Mahal. There are around 200,000 books, periodicals and electronic services including over 1,000 tapes and CD-ROMs. The library has a collection of books relating to Engineering and Technology, Management, Science, Humanities, Sanskrit Literature, Tamil Literature, Arts, Indian Culture, Life Sciences, Education, and subscribes to over 200 national and international journals and also all Leading Magazines and Newspapers.

Medical centre
A medical centre in the campus provides medical care to students and staff.

WiFi enabled Campus

The web centre has high end servers and is connected by NKN (National Knowledge Network)  1 Gbps Intranet / Internet connectivity via NIC.

Internet connection is available campus wide, through the campus network, to enhance research and teaching activities. The Computing and development centre has high end client systems which are used by staff and students for research and development activities.

WiFI connectivity is set up for the use of students and staff.

Banking and Postal Services

Indian Bank has a full-fledged branch at Enathur, in our University campus.

All major Nationalized Banks have their branches inside Kanchipuram town (at a distance of about 5 km from Enathur).

ATM Facility is available.

The Enathur branch post office is located on the campus and provides postal services.

References

External links
Official website
 village website

Deemed universities in Tamil Nadu
Universities and colleges in Kanchipuram district
Kanchipuram
1993 establishments in Tamil Nadu
Educational institutions established in 1993